Liponyssoides sanguineus is a species of mite that infests the house mouse (Mus musculus).

It can transmit human disease, is associated with causing rodent mite dermatitis in humans and is noted for carrying Rickettsia akari, which causes rickettsialpox.

It was formerly known as Allodermanyssus sanguineus.

See also 
 List of mites associated with cutaneous reactions

References

Mesostigmata
Cosmopolitan arthropods